Golfo Dulce may refer to:
 Golfo Dulce, Costa Rica, the name of an inlet in Costa Rica.
 Lake Izabal, the largest lake in Guatemala which also is known as 'Golfo Dulce'.